Borovnica railway station is the principal railway station in Borovnica, Slovenia. The old building of the station was built in 1856 at the beginning of Borovnica Viaduct. It stayed in use until the viaduct was demolished during World War II in the 1940s. The new station building was built and opened in 1947.

References

External links 

Official site of the Slovenian railways 

Railway stations in Slovenia